Henry of Nassau, count of Nassau-Dillenburg, (15 October 1550 in Dillenburg – 14 April 1574 in Mook) was the youngest brother of William I of Orange-Nassau.

He was the twelfth and last child of William the Rich and Juliana of Stolberg-Werningerode, and was raised a Lutheran. He studied in Leuven and Strasbourg. He and his brothers William and Louis joined the Huguenot army of Louis I de Bourbon, prince de Condé and took part in the Battle of Moncontour (30 October 1569). Henry fell in the battle of Mookerheyde at the age of 23. His elder brother Louis was also killed in this battle. Their bodies have never been recovered.

References 
 Article in Grote Winkler Prins, Encyclopedie in twintig delen, 7th edition, Elsevier, Amsterdam (1972).

1550 births
1574 deaths
People from Dillenburg
Dutch military personnel killed in action
Henry of Nassau-Dillenburg
Sons of monarchs